Mohammed Taher Mohammed (born 1964) is an Iraqi weightlifter. He competed in the men's middle heavyweight event at the 1984 Summer Olympics.

References

1964 births
Living people
Iraqi male weightlifters
Olympic weightlifters of Iraq
Weightlifters at the 1984 Summer Olympics
Place of birth missing (living people)
20th-century Iraqi people